Payam Salehi, is an Iranian singer and guitarist, and is a founder and main member of the band Arian.

Biography 
Encouraged by his parents, he turned to music and learned to play the santur with Azita Hajian as a child. After learning the santur, he turned to guitar and piano. Together with Ali Pahlavan, he formed Arian, which was originally a traditional music group.

Mohammad Reza Golzar was once the guitarist of Arian, but later left the group. A few years after the end of Arian's activity, he performed the parvaz piece in a concert in the United States with Payam Salehi, which caused dissatisfaction between Ali Pahlavan and Arian's agents, because the single was performed without the permission of the band members at the concert.

References

External links 

21st-century Iranian male singers
1975 births
Living people